Sudhamek Agung Waspodo Sunyoto (Indonesian old spelling, Sudhamek Agoeng Waspodo Soenjoto. Also known as Sudhamek or Sudhamek AWS) is an Indonesian billionaire and a member of the Pancasila Ideology Development Agency Steering Committee since 7 June 2017. Prior this appointment, he was Chairman of GarudaFood Group. He, as of 2022, is one of the 150 richest Indonesians. On 13 October 2021, he appointed as National Research and Innovation Agency Steering Committee member.

Early life, education, and careers 
Sudhamek was born from Chinese Indonesian family and last of 11 siblings. He is son of Darmo Putro, a Chinese, former Indonesian Revolutionary hero-turned-trader and later owner of PT. Tudung Putra Jaya, a small company at that time which trading tapioca flour, founded in 1958. Despite hailed from a quite financially well family, he was always bullied in school due to his unusual name given to him by his parents. Being bullied until high school resulted to his anxiety, trauma, and loss of confidence resulted in borderline marks during his school time. He regained his confidence after achieved best marks during his time as economy student at Universitas Kristen Satya Wacana (UKSW), Salatiga. Sudhamek was graduated from UKSW and obtained 2 degrees at nearly the same time. He obtained bachelor's degree in Economy in 1981 and bachelor's degree in Law on 1982 from UKSW. Despite his aspiration to continue his education to master's degree and went abroad, he did not afford it at that time due to financial limitation of his family. He later worked at Gudang Garam for more than 13 years, enriching his experience by-trade in business and management. He later returned to his family business and continuing it until finally become GarudaFood Group.

On 23 January 2016, he granted doctor honoris causa in Economy from his alma mater, UKSW.

Personal life 
Sudhamek married to Lanny Rosiana in 1990. From the marriage, they had 3 children, 2 sons and 1 daughter. While he was not graduated from big university abroad and/or had higher than bachelor's degree, his children were graduate from renowned university with his 2 elder sons, Adhitya and Yudie completed their bachelor's degree from University of Michigan, Ann Arbor and master's degree at Babson University, and his only daughter, Henny was graduated from LASALLE College of the Arts.

Sudhamek is a Buddhist from Mahayana school.

References 

1956 births
Living people
Indonesian business executives
Indonesian Buddhists